Aestuariicoccus is a Gram-negative and strictly aerobic genus of bacteria from the family of Rhodobacteraceae with one known species (Aestuariicoccus marinus). Aestuariicoccus marinus has been isolated from tidal flat sediments from the Yellow Sea in Korea.

References

Rhodobacteraceae
Bacteria genera
Monotypic bacteria genera